John Cashmore Ltd (also known as J Cashmore, or simply as Cashmore's or other derivations) was a company operating largely in Newport, Monmouthshire, Wales. It became best known for ship breaking and scrapping redundant British railway locomotives.

History
The company was founded in 1872 by a member of the Cashmore family in Horseley Heath, Staffordshire. While eventually the large part of the business was in Newport, with a business address at the Old Town Dock, the headquarters was in Great Bridge, Tipton. Scrapping of steam locomotives from the LMR, ER and WR, also took place at Gold's Hill, Great Bridge.

The shipbreaking business was closed in October 1976, and the remaining business was incorporated into the Gynwed Group.

Ship breaking 
It ran a ship breaking business on the banks of the River Usk, which had a very high tide enabling large vessels to be moved upstream. It scrapped many ex-Royal Navy ships including the following:
 (Destroyer - 1914)
 (Destroyer - 1922)
 (Submarine - 1922)
 (Submarine - 1922)
 (Submarine - 1922)
 (Submarine - 1922)
 (Light cruiser - 1922)
 (Light cruiser - 1923)
 (1923)
 (Light Cruiser -1923)
 (Dreadnought battleship - 1923)
 (Submarine - 1926)
 (Submarine - 1926)
 (Submarine - 1926)
 (1927)
 (Destroyer - 1928)
 (Submarine - 1928)
 (Submarine - 1928)
 (Submarine - 1935)
 (Minesweeper - 1935)
 (Sloop - 1938)
 (Submarine - 1946)
 (Submarine - 1946)
 (Light Cruiser - 1946)
 (1947)
 (1947)
 (1948)
 (1948)
 (1948)
 (1949)
 (1949)
HMS Leamington (1951)
 (1954)
 (1956)
 (1958)
 (1958)
 (1959)
 (1964)
 (1965)
 (1965)
 (1967)
 (1970)
 (1970)
 (Submarine - 1971).
 (1972).

Civilian vessels 
 MV Reina del Pacifico (1958)
  (1968)

Contributions to railway preservation 
Thousands of vehicles were sent for scrapping with no chance of being rescued for preservation. Their fates were sealed the moment they arrived. However, a few were able to escape scrapping for preservation; GWR 6400 Class No. 6430, which is now owned by the Dartmouth Steam Railway, being one of the most famous examples. BR Standard Class 8 No. 71000 Duke of Gloucester, which was the only member of its class built and was eventually preserved years later, was towed to this area in 1967 and due to be scrapped here. However, a man named Maurice Sheppard, who was a former fireman for British Railways, realized that this locomotive was delivered to the wrong scrapyard. It was supposed to go to Woodham Brothers in South Wales instead. In October 1967, No. 71000 was moved out of Cashmore's and into Barry Scrapyard where it was exposed to the elements until it was rescued in 1974. BR Standard Class 4 4-6-0 No. 75014 was also sent to Cashmore's scrapyard along with No. 71000 Duke of Gloucester before being sent to Barry, No. 75014 remained at Barry scrapyard until 1981.

References

Tipton
Defunct companies of Wales
Companies based in Newport, Wales
River Usk
Ship breaking
Railway scrapyards in the United Kingdom